Astro Zhi Zun HD (Astro至尊HD in Simplified Chinese) began broadcasting on 16 June 2010 as Astro's first Chinese-language channel and non-English language HD channel. This channel will mirror 80% of the content on Astro Wah Lai Toi, including drama series and sitcom on weekdays, variety shows, game shows and travelogues.

Until 12 January 2013, Astro Zhi Zun HD featured Mandarin and Cantonese programme languages. This included Chinese dramas, documentary, variety shows, TVB content, local Cantonese programmes and more. The non-Cantonese content on Astro Zhi Zun HD was then moved to Astro Quan Jia HD.

Astro Zhi Zun HD renamed as Astro Wah Lai Toi HD on 6 October 2014.

External links
 Astro Zhi Zun HD on zhongwen.astro.com.my

Astro Malaysia Holdings television channels
Television channels and stations established in 2010
Television channels and stations disestablished in 2014